Thomas Rawlinson was an 18th-century English industrialist who is widely reputed, though not without controversy, to have been the inventor of the modern kilt.

Very little is easily found about Thomas Rawlinson himself, even his dates of birth and death. He is described in nearly all accounts as being an Englishman and a Quaker who went to the Highlands in the aftermath of the suppression of the 1715 Jacobite rising to establish an iron works.

The origins of the modern kilt

Prior to the turn of the 18th century, the form of the kilt typically worn in the Scottish Highlands was what is now known as the belted plaid or great kilt, which consisted of a large tartan or multi-coloured blanket or wrap (Gaelic felie, with various spellings) which was gathered into loose pleating and drawn about the body and secured by a belt at the waist, the lower part hanging down covering the legs to about the knee.

Sometime in the late 17th century or, at the latest, the early part of the 18th century, a new form of this garment was introduced and became popular. This new form consisted essentially of the lower portion only of the great kilt, at first untailored, but many years later with the pleats or belt loops sewn in to better secure the garment about the waist.

After the repeal of the Act of Proscription, interest attached as to the origins of this new garment, called the little kilt''' (Gaelic: felie-beg, Anglicized to philabeg, again with various spellings). In a letter published in Edinburgh Magazine for March 1785, but claimed by partisan sources as supposedley written some years earlier, in 1768, Ivan Baillie of Aberiachan, Esq. A known promoter of political union with England and to be anti Highland, asserted that the new form of the kilt was the creation of Thomas Rawlinson, an entrepreneur who had established an iron works in the Highlands (specifically, in woodland at Invergarry, near Fort William, Invernessshire).

According to Baillie, Rawlinson, observing how the great kilt was "a cumbersome unwieldy habit to men at work. . ." decided to "abridge the dress, and make it handy and convenient for his workmen". This he did by directing the usage of the lower, pleated portion only, the upper portion being detached and set aside.

Controversy

The full text of the letter of Ivan Baillie is reproduced in John Telfer Dunbar's History of Highland Dress. Dunbar quotes the letter approvingly, at the same time citing McClintock's Old Irish and Highland Dress in support of the story, stating that "many attempts have been made to produce proof of the little kilt (Gaelic feilidh beag) before that date (i.e., before about 1725 – ed.) but nothing so far published can substantiate such claims." He goes on to say that "some of the most popular 'evidence' has been examined and refuted in McClintock .  .".

However, since the publication of Dunbar's book, the Baillie version of events has been disputed. Matthew Newsome, director emeritus of the Scottish Tartans Museum in North Carolina, for instance, has stated that  ". . . we have numerous illustrations of Highlanders wearing only the bottom part of the belted plaid that date long before Rawlinson ever set foot in Scotland", going on to assert that "there is some suggestion of its use in the late seventeenth century, and it was definitely being worn in the early eighteenth century".

Notwithstanding: when Baillie's account was published in the Edinburgh Magazine in March 1785, it was not contradicted, and was on the contrary confirmed by the two greatest authorities on Scottish custom of the time, Sir John Sinclair and John Pinkerton and by the independent testimony of the Glengarry family, whose chief, Ian MacDonnell was Rawlinson's business partner (see Hugh Trevor-Roper,)

Growing popularity

Following the defeat of the Highland clans at the Battle of Culloden in the Second Jacobite Rebellion, the British parliament banned the wearing of tartan and other symbols of the Scottish Highlanders in the 1746 Dress Act. The Act was repealed in 1782 and, in the decades following, there was a romantic revival of interest in things connected with the Highlands, including their dress.

Sir Walter Scott's novels of Highland adventure were best-sellers, and the Highland Society of London became very influential. The "Highland revival" culminated in the visit of King George IV to Edinburgh in 1822, a pageant in large measure orchestrated by Scott. Capitalizing on the Highland craze, the Society declared Rawlinson's kilt "one of the essential pieces of Highland wear". The actual Highland Scots had become a despised underclass, but British Army generals, aristocracy, and landowners could now be seen wearing kilts and listening to the bagpipes. Queen Victoria first visited the Braemar Society's highland gathering at Invercauld in 1844, later buying nearby Balmoral Castle and becoming the society's patron as the Royal family continued to popularise the wearing of the kilt.

Enduring legacy

Though knowledge of Thomas Rawlinson's contribution to Scottish dress was forgotten for the better part of two centuries, the politically driven allegations of his alleged version of the kilt still lives on today, and many who wear it are completely oblivious to its possible Industrial Age influences.

References

 The text of the letter of Ivan Baillie can be found in John Telfer Dunbar, History of Highland Dress'' (Philadelphia, Dufour Editions, 1964), pages 12–13.
 Hobsbawm, Eric; Ranger, Terence, eds. (1983) The Invention of Tradition, Cambridge University Press UK.

External links
 The Early History of the Kilt
 A Site on Rawlinson's Invention

English inventors
English Quakers
People from Chorley